Baquerín de Campos is a municipality located in the province of Palencia, Castile and León, Spain. According to the 2004 census (INE), the municipality had a population of 24 inhabitants.

It is the birthplace of the protomartyr saint of China Francis Ferdinand de Capillas.

References

Municipalities in the Province of Palencia